Treble in Trouble is an EP by the Washington, D.C. rock band Ted Leo and the Pharmacists, released in 2000 by Ace Fu Records. It was the group's first release as a full band, following a debut album which had essentially been a Ted Leo solo release. Following that album Leo assembled a backing band called The Pharmacists and recorded this EP, which was much less experimental than his solo releases and structured more in punk rock and indie rock. It includes versions of two songs Leo had written with his previous band, the Sin Eaters.

Track listing
All songs written by Ted Leo and the Pharmacists except where indicated.
"Abner Louima v. Gov. Pete Wilson" (written and originally performed by Ted Leo and The Sin Eaters)
"Come Baby Come"
"The 11th"
"Treble in Trouble" (written and originally performed by Ted Leo and The Sin Eaters)
"Little Girl in Bloom" (written and originally performed by Thin Lizzy)

Performers
Ted Leo - vocals, guitar
James Canty - guitar, backing vocals
Jodi V.B. - bass, backing vocals
Amy Farina - drums

Album information
Record label: Ace Fu Records
Recorded January 2000 at Pirate House Studios in Washington, D.C. by Brendan Canty
Engineered by Brendan Canty
Mastered March 2000 by Alan Douches at West West Side Music in Tenafly, New Jersey

References

Ted Leo and the Pharmacists albums
2000 EPs
Ace Fu Records EPs